OneCity Vancouver is a municipal political party in Vancouver, British Columbia, Canada. It was founded in 2014 by independent activists and former members of the left-wing Coalition of Progressive Electors (COPE), including David Chudnovsky and Rafael Joseph Aquino; Aquino was OneCity's first candidate to run for public office.

History 

OneCity first nominated a candidate for office, RJ Aquino, in the 2014 Vancouver municipal election. Aquino placed 22nd.

In the 2017 Vancouver by-election, the party elected its first candidate, Carrie Bercic, who placed eighth in a race for all nine open seats on the Vancouver School Board

OneCity, together with four other progressive municipal parties (including COPE, Vision Vancouver, and the Green Party), agreed to a deal brokered by the Vancouver & District Labour Council to avoid vote splitting in the 2018 municipal election by limiting each party's number of candidates. In that election, Christine Boyle was elected as the first OneCity member of Vancouver City Council, and Jennifer Reddy was elected to the Vancouver School Board.

Ahead of the 2022 municipal election, OneCity announced the results of its nomination race on March 7, becoming the first municipal party to nominate a slate of candidates for the October 15 election. The party's members re-nominated OneCity councillor Boyle, along with three new candidates for city council: president of the Urban Native Youth Association Matthew Norris, urban planner Iona Bonamis, and health economist Ian Cromwell. The party did not run a candidate for mayor, tacitly supporting incumbent mayor Kennedy Stewart, with whom OneCity had cooperated on municipal legislation.

OneCity fielded three candidates for the Vancouver Park Board: Serena Jackson, Tiyaltelut Kristen Rivers, and Caitlin Stockwell. In addition, OneCity ran five candidates for Vancouver School Board: incumbent Jennifer Reddy, Rory Brown, Kyla Epstein, Krista Sigurdson, and Gavin Somers.

OneCity released its 2022 election platform on September 6 with the campaign slogan "You Belong in Vancouver." The platform committed to addressing the housing crisis with a promise to allow new rental buildings of up to six storeys, including small-scale retail at street level, in all parts of the city. The party also promised to allow new condo developments up to four storeys across the city. Beyond housing, the platform also addressed community safety, harm reduction, Indigenous justice, climate change, arts, economic development, and active transportation.

In the 2022 election, councillor Christine Boyle and school board trustee Jennifer Reddy were re-elected. None of the party's 11 other candidates were successful in their campaigns, but the party increased its vote share by more than 60%. Boyle is left as the sole social democratic councillor after the defeat of mayor Kennedy Stewart and COPE councillor Jean Swanson, but OneCity has pledged cooperation with the ABC Vancouver council majority on shared priorities.

Political positions 
The party's platform deals with social inequality, inclusive communities, improving public schools, the opioid epidemic, and affordable housing. OneCity supports the introduction of a land value tax to both generate revenue for public housing projects and curb real estate speculation.

A motion introduced by OneCity councillor Christine Boyle saw the City of Vancouver's declare a climate emergency on January 16, 2019.

In 2021, Boyle sought to gain council approval of a bicycle lane on Commercial Drive between 14th Avenue and Graveley Street, but her motion was defeated by Green councillors. In June 2022, a motion tabled by Boyle successfully amended the Broadway Plan to require the installation of an AAA bicycle lane along Broadway upon completion of the SkyTrain extension.

On council, Boyle sought to gain approval from Vancouver City Council to allow cooperative and social housing up to 12 storeys in height in select multi-family residential areas in the city after council had unanimously agreed to allowing cooperative and social housing up to six storeys in height in similar areas of the city. However, in January 2022, councillors affiliated with the Greens, Non-Partisan Association, ABC Vancouver, and TEAM for a Livable Vancouver voted against the motion and it was defeated. OneCity stated that votes such as this one have led to greater homelessness and housing unaffordability in Vancouver due to the denial of greater housing supply in the city; critics of the motion based their opposition on the definition of "social housing" used in the motion, as well as the possibility of shadows being generated from taller buildings.

OneCity supports the legalization of consuming alcohol in Vancouver's public parks and beaches without geographic restrictions.

OneCity is considered to be an "urbanist" party in Vancouver's political context, and compared to other municipal parties it is more ardent in the degree to which it favours the modification of zoning laws to increase the supply of housing in Vancouver, the lack of which has been cited as a contributor to the city's high housing prices. This position has been criticized based on the position that housing affordability is provincial or federal issue rather than a municipal one; OneCity has responded by stating that Vancouver should maximize the use of tools at its own discretion to tackle issues such as climate change, homelessness, and affordability.

Electoral results

See also 
 2022 Vancouver municipal election

References

External links 
 

2014 establishments in British Columbia
Political parties established in 2014
Municipal political parties in Vancouver
Social democratic parties in Canada